Ali Nasser Saleh (born May 16, 1986) is a Qatari footballer of Yemeni descent who is a defender.

International career
He is a member of the Qatar national football team.

Notes 

1986 births
Living people
Qatari footballers
Lekhwiya SC players
Al-Wakrah SC players
Al Sadd SC players
Muaither SC players
Umm Salal SC players
Mesaimeer SC players
Qatari people of Yemeni descent
2007 AFC Asian Cup players
Asian Games medalists in football
Footballers at the 2006 Asian Games
Qatar Stars League players
Qatari Second Division players
Asian Games gold medalists for Qatar
Association football defenders
Medalists at the 2006 Asian Games
Qatar international footballers